Palestro was the name of at least three ships of the Italian Navy and may refer to:

 , a coastal defense ship sunk at the Battle of Lissa in 1866
 , a  launched in 1871 and scrapped in 1902
 , a  launched in 1919 and sunk in 1940

Italian Navy ship names